Efe Jerry Obode (born 14 February 1989) is a Nigerian footballer.

Honours
Erbil SC
Iraqi Premier League: 2011–12 
2012 AFC Cup - Runner-up

External links
 
 profile at Goal

1989 births
Living people
Nigerian footballers
Expatriate footballers in Syria
Expatriate footballers in Thailand
Efe Jerry Obode
Association football forwards
Syrian Premier League players
Efe Jerry Obode
Nakhon Si United F.C. players